Luang Phabang, (Lao: ຫລວງພະບາງ/ຫຼວງພະບາງ) or Louangphabang (pronounced ), commonly transliterated into Western languages from the pre-1975 Lao spelling ຫຼວງພຣະບາງ (ຣ = silent r) as Luang Prabang, literally meaning "Royal Buddha Image", is a city in north central Laos, consisting of 58 adjacent villages, of which 33 comprise the UNESCO Town Of Luang Prabang World Heritage Site. It was listed in 1995 for unique and "remarkably" well preserved architectural, religious and cultural heritage, a blend of the rural and urban developments over several centuries, including the French colonial influences during the 19th and 20th centuries.

The centre of the city consists of four main roads and is located on a peninsula at the confluence of the Nam Khan and Mekong River. Luang Prabang is well known for its numerous Buddhist temples and monasteries. Every morning, hundreds of monks from the various monasteries walk through the streets collecting alms.

The city was formerly the capital of a kingdom of the same name. It had also been known by the ancient name of Xieng Thong. It was the royal capital and seat of government of the Kingdom of Laos, until the Pathet Lao takeover in 1975. The city is part of Luang Prabang District of Luang Prabang Province and is the capital and administrative centre of the province. Currently, the population of the city as a whole is roughly 56,000 inhabitants with the UNESCO protected site being inhabited by around 24,000.

History

Dvaravati city state kingdoms
By the 6th century in the Chao Phraya River Valley, Mon peoples had coalesced to create the Dvaravati kingdoms.  In the north, Haripunjaya (Lamphun) emerged as a rival power to the Dvaravati.  By the 8th century the Mon had pushed north to create city states, in Fa Daet (modern Kalasin, northeastern Thailand), Sri Gotapura (Sikhottabong) near modern Tha Khek, Laos, Muang Sua (Luang Prabang), and Chantaburi (Vientiane).  In the 8th century CE, Sri Gotapura (Sikhottabong) was the strongest of these early city states, and controlled trade throughout the middle Mekong region. The city states were loosely bound politically, but were culturally similar and introduced Therevada Buddhism from Sri Lankan missionaries throughout the region.

Khmer domination

Lan Xang period
Xieng Dong Xieng Thong experienced a brief period of Khmer suzerainty under Jayavarman VII from 1185 to 1191. By 1180 the Sipsong Panna had regained their independence from the Khmers, however, and in 1238 an internal uprising in the Khmer outpost of Sukhothai expelled the Khmer overlords. Xieng Dong Xieng Thong in 1353 became the capital of the Lan Xang kingdom. In 1359 the Khmer king from Angkor gave the Phra Bang to his son-in-law, the first Lang Xang monarch Fa Ngum (1353-1373); to provide Buddhist legitimacy both to Fa Ngum's rule and by extension to the sovereignty of Laos and was used to spread Theravada Buddhism in the new kingdom. The capital name was changed to Luangphabang, where it was kept, named after the Buddha image. Luang Prabang was briefly occupied by the Vietnamese forces during Emperor Lê Thánh Tông's 1478–1480 expedition against Lan Xang and Lanna. The capital was moved in 1560 by King Setthathirath I to Vientiane, which remains the capital today.

In 1707, Lan Xang fell apart because of a dynastic struggle and Luang Prabang became the capital of the independent Kingdom of Luang Phrabang. When France annexed Laos, the French recognised Luang Prabang as the royal residence of Laos. Eventually, the ruler of Luang Prabang became synonymous with the figurehead of Laos. When Laos achieved independence, the king of Luang Prabang, Sisavang Vong, became the head of state of the Kingdom of Laos.

World War II

The town was the scene of many events during and in the aftermath of World War II and it was occupied by several foreign countries during the war (Vichy France, Thailand, Imperial Japan, Free France, and Nationalist China). Initially the Vichy French controlled the city but lost it to Thai forces following the Franco-Thai War of 1940–1941. On 9 March 1945, a nationalist group declared Laos once more independent, with Luang Prabang as its capital but on 7 April 1945 two battalions of Japanese troops occupied the city. The Japanese attempted to force Sisavang Vong (the King of Luang Prabang) to declare Laotian independence but on 8 April he instead simply declared an end to Laos' status as a French protectorate. The King then secretly sent Prince Kindavong to represent Laos to the Allied forces and Sisavang Vatthana as representative to the Japanese. Following Japan's surrender to the Allies, Free French forces were sent to reoccupy Laos and entered Luang Prabang on 25 August, at which time the King assured the French that Laos remained a French colonial protectorate. In September the Chinese Nationalist forces arrived to receive the surrender of the remaining Japanese forces but also quickly set about buying up the Laotian opium crop.

Laotian Civil War era
In April and May 1946, the French attempted to recapture Laos by using paratroops to retake Vientiane and Luang Prabang and drive Phetsarath and the Lao Issara ministers out of Laos and into Thailand and Vietnam. During the First Indochina War, the Viet Minh and Pathet Lao forces attempted to capture the city several times in 1953 and 1954, but were stopped before they could reach it by French forces. During the Laotian Civil War of the 1950s, 60s, and 70s, a secret American airbase was located at Luang Prabang and it was the scene of fighting. Luang Prabang remained the royal capital until 1975, when the Pathet Lao communist forces seized power with North Vietnamese support and dissolved the monarchy.

Monarchs of Luang Prabang

Khun Lo, warlord who founded the city
Fa Ngum, prince of Luang Prabang who founded Lan Xang
Oun Kham, king who ruled under the French
Kham Souk (Zakarine), king who ruled under the French and who pushed for independence
Sisavang Vong, king under the French, and who, when France granted Laos independence, became king of the whole country

Tourism

Luang Prabang has both natural and historical sites. Among the natural tourism sites are the Kuang Si Falls, Tat Sae Waterfalls, and Pak Ou Caves. Elephant riding is offered at some sites. Phou Si, in the center of the town, has broad views of the town and river systems, and is a popular place to watch the sun setting over the Mekong River. At the end of the main street of Luang Prabang is a night market where stalls sell shirts, bracelets, and other souvenirs. The Haw Kham Royal Palace Museum and the Wat Xieng Thong temple are among the best known historical sites. The town, particularly the main street, is dotted with many smaller wats such as Wat Hosian Voravihane. Every morning at sunrise, monks walk in a procession through the streets accepting alms offered by local residents, an event popular with tourists. Mountain biking is quite common, with people often biking around the town or to the waterfalls for the day.
Down the Mekong River, a 15-minute boat ride from the city centre, Ban Chan (the pottery village ) is an interesting place. Luang Prabang received 'Best City' in the Wanderlust Travel Awards 2015.

Gastronomy

Luang Prabang has a rich artistic and culinary history and the city's cooks were hired by the king. Typical local dishes include: Or lam (O-lam, the favourite dish of Luang Prabang locals), Luang Prabang sausage, mokpa (steamed fish), and Kaipen made from Mekong River moss (served fried) with the Luang Prabang's famous Jeow Bong.

Transportation

Air
Luang Prabang is served by Luang Prabang International Airport with non-stop flights to adjoining countries.

Road
Luang Prabang is served by Route 13, which connects to Vang Vieng and Vientiane to the south, and to Boten in the north. The road is paved, though the surface is in poor condition at places. Since 2014, a new road connects Kasi (close to Vang Vieng) to Luang Prabang, allowing the trip to be made in about 3 hours (compared to 5 hours via Route 13). Several daily buses run from Vientiane to Luang Prabang, taking 11–13 hours.

The road from Huay Xai to Luang Prabang is poorly maintained, remote, unlit, unmarked and dangerous for the unfamiliar, particularly in the rainy season. Buses regularly travel the route for 14–16 hours.

If coming from Vietnam, sleeper buses can be caught from Hanoi to either Luang Prabang or Vang Vieng.

Waterway
The Mekong River itself is also an important transportation link. At Chiang Khong it is possible to hire a barge to cross the river. A trip from Huay Xai, across from Thailand, downstream to Luang Prabang takes two days by slow boat, typically with a stop at Pakbeng.

Rail
Beginning December 2021, Luang Prabang is served by the high speed Vientiane–Boten railway. The railway parallels Route 13, and serve as Laos' first major north-south railway line, from Boten at the Chinese border in the north to Vientiane in the south. The complete journey takes less than three hours by train instead of three days by road.

Climate
Luang Prabang features a tropical wet and dry climate (Aw) under the Köppen climate classification. While the city is generally very warm throughout the year, it is noticeably cooler during December and January. Luang Prabang also experiences wet and dry seasons, with the wet season from April until October, and the dry season during the remaining five months.

Sister cities
 Bagan, Myanmar (2009)
 Chengdu, China (2017)

See also

Gallery

References

Further reading

External links

 
 City portal of Luang Prabang on Luangprabang-laos.com
 

 
Populated places in Luang Prabang Province
World Heritage Sites in Laos
Buddhist pilgrimage sites in Laos
Populated places on the Mekong River